Rajesh Peter (18 August 1959 – 16 November 1995) was an Indian first class cricketer who played for Delhi in the Ranji Trophy. A fast bowler, he played in the 1981-82 Trophy winning side. In the final against Karnataka, he contributed 67 not out with the bat in an unbroken ninth wicket partnership of 118 with Rakesh Shukla, as Karnataka chased down 706 for a first innings lead on the sixth day of the match.

In 1996, he was found dead in his New Delhi flat in suspicious circumstances.

References

1959 births
1996 deaths
Indian cricketers
Delhi cricketers
1995 suicides
Suicides in India